An Essay Upon Projects (1697) was the first volume published by Daniel Defoe. It begins with a portrait of his time as a "Projecting Age" and subsequently illustrates plans for the economic and social improvement of England, including an early proposal for a national insurance scheme.

Publication
The text was written in 1693 and published in 1697. The frontispiece state "printed by R. R. for Tho. Cockerill, at the Corner of Warwick-Lane, near Paternoster – Row. MDCXCVII". There is no known manuscript of the work. The essay was reprinted several times and reached a wide audience. The book was dedicated to Dalby Thomas

Subsequent publications on the same theme
Many of its issues were later revised in a series of pamphlets which were published under the nom-de-plume of Andrew Moreton. They are titled Every-body's Business, Is No-body's Business (1725), The Protestant Monastery (1726), Parochial Tyranny (1727), Augusta Triumphans (1728) and Second Thoughts are Best (1729). Compared to these works, however, An Essay Upon Projects is more focused on moral criticism than being project-oriented.

A list of the chapters

Author's Preface - to Dalby Thomas, Esq.
Author's Introduction
The History of Projects
Of Projectors
Of Banks
Of the Highways
Of Assurances
Of Friendly Societies
The Proposal is for a Pension Office
Of Wagering
Of Fools
Of Bankrupts
Of Academies
Of a Court Merchant
Of Seamen
The Conclusion

References

Bibliography
 Backscheider, P B, Daniel Defoe.His Life, The Johns Hopkins University Press, Baltimore and London, 1989.
 “Social Projects”, Daniel Defoe. The Collection of the Lily Library, Indiana University Bloomington, 2008, retrieved 25 October 2015, <http://www.indiana.edu/~liblilly/defoe/projects.html> 
 George, M D, London Life in the Eighteenth Century, Penguin Books, Great Britain, 1979.
 
 
 Novak, M E, “Last Productive Years”,Daniel Defoe Master of Fictions. His Life and Ideas, Oxford University Press, United States of America, 2001.

External links
 Daniel Defoe. The Collection of the Lily Library
 An Essay Upon Projects by Daniel Defoe in the Gutenberg Project

Pamphlets
Works by Daniel Defoe
1697 books